Alwin Elling (1897-1973) was a German film director and editor.

Selected filmography

Editor
 Die lustigen Musikanten (1930)
 Gloria (1931)
 The Squeaker (1931)
 Melody of Love (1932)
 Ein Walzer für dich (1934)
 The Black Whale (1934)
 The Cossack and the Nightingale (1935)
 Eva (1936)

Director
 Orders Are Orders (1936)
 Der lustige Witwenball (1936)
 Carousel (1937)
 Not a Word About Love (1937)
 Meine Frau, die Perle (1937)
 Little County Court (1938)
 Ehe man Ehemann wird (1941)
 The Crazy Clinic (1954)

References

Bibliography 
 Bruns, Jana Francesca . Nazi Cinema's New Women: Marika Roekk, Zarah Leander, Kristina Soederbaum. Stanford University, 2002.
 Niven, Bill, Hitler and Film: The Führer's Hidden Passion. Yale University Press, 2018.
 Waldman, Harry. Nazi Films In America, 1933-1942. McFarland & Co, 2008.

External links 
 

1897 births
1973 deaths
German film directors
German film editors
People from Hanover

de:Alwin Elling